Kenneth David Hodge Jr. (born April 13, 1966) is a Canadian born-American former professional ice hockey player for the Minnesota North Stars, Boston Bruins, and Tampa Bay Lightning.  Born in Canada and raised in the United States, he is the son of former Bruins star Ken Hodge.

Playing career

Hodge was selected by Minnesota in the third round (46th overall) of the 1984 NHL Entry Draft.  He then played three seasons with Boston College, beginning his professional career in 1987–88 with the Kalamazoo Wings in the International Hockey League.  He played three seasons with Kalamazoo, making his NHL debut with five games with the North Stars in 1988–89.  He was traded to the Boston Bruins on August 21, 1990 in exchange for the draft pick later used to select Dallas star defensive forward and multiple Selke Trophy winner Jere Lehtinen.

Hodge's best season was with the Bruins in 1990–91, when he scored 30 goals and added 29 assists, and was named to the NHL All-Rookie Team.  On September 4, 1992, the Bruins traded him to the Tampa Bay Lightning with Matt Hervey for Darin Kimble and future considerations.  His last NHL season was 1992–93 with Tampa Bay, when he had two goals and seven assists in 25 games.  Hodge played several more seasons in the minors, then two seasons in Europe before retiring after the 1997–98 season.

Career statistics

Awards and honors

References

External links

Hockey Draft Central

1966 births
American expatriate ice hockey players in Germany
American men's ice hockey centers
Boston Bruins players
Boston College Eagles men's ice hockey players
Canadian emigrants to the United States
Cardiff Devils players
EC Ratinger Löwen players
Ice hockey players from Massachusetts
Ice hockey people from Ontario
Kansas City Blades players
Living people
Minnesota North Stars draft picks
Minnesota North Stars players
People from Lynnfield, Massachusetts
Sportspeople from Essex County, Massachusetts
Sportspeople from Windsor, Ontario
Tampa Bay Lightning players
American people of English descent
Canadian people of English descent
American expatriate ice hockey players in Wales